The Null and Void Ordinance was an Ordinance passed by the Parliament of England on 20 August 1647. On 26 July 1647 demonstrators had invaded Parliament forcing Independent MPs and the Speaker to flee from Westminster. On 20 August, Oliver Cromwell went to Parliament with an armed escort, following which the Null and Void Ordinance was passed annulling all Parliamentary proceedings since 26 July. Most of the Presbyterian MPs then retreated from Parliament leaving the independent MPs with a majority.

References
British Civil Wars, Commonwealth, and Protectorate 1638-60
"August 1647: An Ordinance for declaring all Votes, Orders and Ordinances passed in one or both Houses since the Force on both Houses, July 26. until the sixth of this present August, 1647. be null and void.", Acts and Ordinances of the Interregnum, 1642-1660 (1911), pp. 998–99. URL: http://www.british-history.ac.uk/report.asp?compid=56199&strquery=998. Date accessed: 4 May 2007.

1647 in law
1647 in England
English laws
English Civil War